We Boom is the third extended play of South Korean–Chinese boy band NCT Dream, the third and teen-aged sub-unit of the South Korean boy band NCT. Released by SM Entertainment and Dreamus digitally on July 26, 2019, and later physically three days later, the EP consists of six tracks, and is the first release of the unit to not contain any Mandarin version for the lead single. SM founder Lee Soo-man continued as the release's executive producer, while several songwriters and producers, such as Ryan S. Jhun, Yoo Young-jin, Sonny J Mason, Deez, Moonshine, Cazzi Opeia, Benjamin Ingrosso, Livvi Franc, Louis Schoorl, Bobii Lewis, Jamil `Digi` Christmas, MZMC, and others, contributed both lyrics and production to the extended play. It was the unit's first major release as a sextet, following the graduation of member Mark in December 2018.

Commercially, the extended play experienced success in South Korea; it became the unit's third chart-topper on the Gaon Album Chart, their first release to receive a Platinum certificate by KMCA, and subsequently the best-selling release by an NCT unit in 2019. In the United States, the EP earned the unit their best sales week to date while becoming the group their second and third top-ten entry on the Billboard World Albums and Billboard Heatseekers Albums, respectively. In conjunction to the EP's promotion, "Boom" was released as the lead single, to where it peaked at number ninety on the Gaon Digital Chart, while barely missing out the top ten on the Billboard World Digital Songs chart. The song, however, was the unit's first entry on the New Zealand Hot Singles chart, debuting at number forty, and has since become one of the unit's signature songs. The unit has since performed several songs from the extended play on The Dream Show and their Beyond LIVE concert in May 2020.

Background and release
On July 8, 2019, it was announced that NCT Dream was preparing for a summer comeback. On July 17, it was revealed that NCT Dream would return with their third EP We Boom and the lead single "Boom" on July 26. Teaser photos were released for each member from July 17 to June 22. The music video teaser was released on July 24 and the full music video on July 26.

The EP was released digitally on July 26, 2019, through several music portals, including MelOn, iTunes and Spotify. The music video for the title song Boom was released the same day. The physical version was released on July 29.

Reception and promotion
The EP title song Boom was described as a piece of urban Hip hop, featuring "powerful verses - a bridge in the latter half of the song that features expressive back-to-back belts by Haechan and Renjun and leads into a warm-toned display by Jisung."

The group started promoting their title track "Boom" on July 26 together with "Stronger". They first performed the lead single on KBS' Music Bank, followed by performances on MBC's Show! Music Core and SBS' Inkigayo.

The album became NCT Dream best sold album up till then, selling more than 300,000 units after a month of release. It also debut on Billboard World albums chart at #7 and NCT Dream was at #3 on Billboard Social 50 Chart. NCT Dream received two wins for "Boom" on The Show on August 6, 2019, and on August 20, 2019, respectively. We Boom later became the best selling album released by any NCT sub-unit up until and in the year of 2019.

The Dream Show 
The Dream Show is NCT Dream's first solo concert which lasted from November 2019 to March 2020.

Tour dates

Cancelled tour dates due to Covid-19

Track listing
Credits adapted from Naver

Charts

Album

Weekly charts

Year-end charts

Singles

"Boom"

Certifications and sales

Accolades

Awards and nominations

Music program awards

Release history

References

2019 EPs
Korean-language EPs
NCT Dream albums
SM Entertainment EPs
IRiver EPs